Martin Edwards (born 21 September 1955) is a male British former swimmer. Edwards competed in the men's 100 metre butterfly at the 1972 Summer Olympics.

He also represented England in the 100 and 200 metres butterfly events, at the 1974 British Commonwealth Games in Christchurch, New Zealand. At the ASA National British Championships he won the 100 metres butterfly title in 1973.

References

External links
 

1955 births
Living people
British male swimmers
Olympic swimmers of Great Britain
Swimmers at the 1972 Summer Olympics
Swimmers at the 1974 British Commonwealth Games
Place of birth missing (living people)
Commonwealth Games competitors for England
Male butterfly swimmers